Thomas Hennessy was an Irish Cumann na nGaedheal politician and medical practitioner.

He was first elected to Dáil Éireann at a by-election on 11 March 1925 for the Dublin South constituency, after the resignation of the Cumann na nGaedheal Teachta Dála (TD) Daniel McCarthy.

He did not contest the June 1927 general election, but after the death of the Fianna Fáil TD for Dublin South, Constance Markievicz, he stood as a candidate in the by-election on 24 August 1927. He won the election, becoming the first – and only – candidate to win more than one by-election to the Dáil.

The 5th Dáil lasted only 98 days in total, and last sat on 16 August 1927, before adjourning until October. However, it did not meet again; a second general election was held in September, and Hennessy was returned to the 6th Dáil. He was re-elected again at the 1932 general election, but was defeated at the 1933 general election, and retired from politics.

References

Year of birth missing
Year of death missing
Cumann na nGaedheal TDs
Members of the 4th Dáil
Members of the 5th Dáil
Members of the 6th Dáil
Members of the 7th Dáil
20th-century Irish medical doctors